This was the first edition of the tournament.

Sumit Nagal won the title after defeating Jay Clarke 6–3, 3–6, 6–2 in the final.

Seeds

Draw

Finals

Top half

Bottom half

References
Main Draw
Qualifying Draw

Bengaluru Open - Singles
2017 Singles